Jack Davies (30 March 1902 – 1985) was an English footballer who played in the Football League for Bury and Swansea Town. He also played for Horwich RMI and Wigan Athletic,

Davies joined Wigan Athletic from Horwich RMI. He made 10 appearances in the Cheshire League during the club's inaugural season in 1932–33.

References

External links
 

1902 births
1985 deaths
Sportspeople from Chorley
Association football goalkeepers
English footballers
Leigh Genesis F.C. players
Bury F.C. players
Swansea City A.F.C. players
Wigan Athletic F.C. players
English Football League players